Thomas Allison White (March 23, 1915 – October 21, 1996) was an American football offensive lineman who played one season with the Philadelphia Eagles of the National Football League. He was drafted by the Philadelphia Eagles in the 13th round of the 1939 NFL Draft. He played college football at Texas Christian University and attended Masonic Home School in Fort Worth, Texas. Allie was the first player in Texas high school history to be voted all state three times in high school. While at TCU, he played with both Sammy Baugh and Davey O’Brien. Later, Allie coached for TCU, and his most prized recruit and player was Bob Lilly. He was inducted into the TCU Lettermen's Association Hall of Fame in 1970. He was born in Crosby, Texas.

References

External links
Just Sports Stats

1915 births
1996 deaths
American football guards
Georgia Pre-Flight Skycrackers football players
Philadelphia Eagles players
TCU Horned Frogs football players
People from Crosby, Texas
Players of American football from Texas
Sportspeople from Harris County, Texas